Barbara Hallie Foote (born March 31, 1950) is an American actress.

Life and career
Born Barbara Hallie Foote in Manhattan, the daughter of Lillian Vallish Foote and writer and director Horton Foote, she was raised in Nyack, New York and New Hampshire. She began her stage career in 1986 when she was cast in the title role of her father's off-Broadway play The Widow Claire, which featured Matthew Broderick, Dan Butler, and Sarah Michelle Gellar. Father and daughter later collaborated on Talking Pictures, Night Seasons, Laura Dennis, When They Speak of Rita, The Last of the Thorntons, The Carpetbagger's Children, The Day Emily Married, The Trip to Bountiful, for which she won the Lucille Lortel Award for Outstanding Featured Actress and was nominated for the Outer Critics Circle Award for Outstanding Featured Actress in a Play, and Dividing the Estate, for which she won the 2008 Richard Seff Award and was nominated for the 2009 Tony Award for Best Performance by a Featured Actress in a Play. She was appearing in the Hartford Stage production of her father's theatrical adaptation of the Harper Lee novel To Kill a Mockingbird when he died. She appeared in The Orphans' Home Cycle off-Broadway in 2009, receiving an Outer Critics Circle Award nomination, Outstanding Featured Actress in a Play. In 2012, Foote appeared as Dolores and Mrs. Crawford in the off-Broadway production of Harrison, TX: Three Plays by Horton Foote with Primary Stages. She then appeared as Pauline in the Primary Stages production of Him. Foote also played Rosalynn Carter in the 2014 production of Camp David at Arena Stage, the performance was attended by Rosalynn Carter herself, as well as President Jimmy Carter.

Foote also won the Obie Award in 1993 and the Drama League Award in 2000 and 2002 and was nominated for the 1995 Drama Desk Award for Outstanding Featured Actress in a Play for The Horton Foote Plays.

Foote's movie career has been limited to small roles in C.H.U.D., Walking to the Waterline, Friends with Money, and Paranormal Activity 3, among others. Her television appearances include Miami Vice, Murder, She Wrote, and Law & Order and the television movies The Habitation of Dragons and Alone, both written by her father.

Personal life
Foote is married to actor/screenwriter Devon Abner and is the sister of playwright/screenwriter Daisy Foote.

Filmography

Film

Television

References

External links

1950 births
Actresses from New York City
American film actresses
American stage actresses
American television actresses
Drama Desk Award winners
Living people
20th-century American actresses
21st-century American actresses